The Christian Episcopal Church (XnEC) is a Continuing Anglican jurisdiction consisting of parishes in Canada and the United States and with oversight of several parishes in the Cayman Islands. Its bishops are in apostolic succession through the Right Rev. A. Donald Davies (deceased). Davies was formerly the bishop-in-charge of the Convocation of American Churches in Europe and the bishop of the Episcopal Diocese of Fort Worth, Texas.

Bishop Archibald Donald Davies had, in 1970, been consecrated the fourth bishop of the Episcopal Diocese of Dallas. Fifteen bishops of the Episcopal Church assisted at the consecration of Bishop Davies, with John Elbridge Hines as one of the principal consecrators. Bishop Hines had himself been consecrated the fifth bishop of the Episcopal Diocese of Texas in 1945, and was later elected the Presiding Bishop of the Episcopal Church in the United States of America. 

In 1992, following years of controversy in the Episcopal Church in the USA and the Anglican Church of Canada over what conservative members considered a steady drift towards both political and religious liberalism, the Episcopal Missionary Church (EMC) was founded. Although this was fifteen years after the Congress of St. Louis at which Anglicans from the USA and Canada created the Continuing Anglican Movement in opposition to women's ordination, Prayer Book alterations, and more relaxed sexual standards approved in ECUSA, the EMC is usually considered a Continuing Church. Bishop Davies was elected its first presiding bishop. He was also elected Archbishop and Primate of the several parishes constituting the Christian Episcopal Church of Canada. 

A decade later, a split in the Episcopal Missionary Church's Diocese of the West produced the Christian Episcopal Church in the USA. Those who left the Diocese then appealed to Bishop Davies and joined with the churches in Canada. At one time, the XnEC in the United States counted parishes in Mississippi, South Carolina, California, Arizona, Texas and other states, but at present its parishes are two in Washington State and one in Florida. The current Archbishop and Primate is the Theodore C. Casimes.  XnEC's Bishop Co-Adjutor is the Rt. Rev. Dr. Tim Klerekoper.

Every bishop in the Christian Episcopal Church has had Archbishop Davies as one of his consecrators. All, therefore, can claim to have received valid episcopal orders through the bishops of the Church of England, and the Scottish Episcopal Church, but also from the Episcopal Church in the USA.

The Christian Episcopal Church of Canada is headed by Robert David Redmile.

In September 2017 it was announced by Archbishop Theodore Casimes that Gavin Ashenden had been consecrated as a missionary bishop in the United Kingdom and Europe by the Christian Episcopal Church.  However, on the fourth Sunday of Advent 2019, Ashenden was received into the Roman Catholic Church by Bishop Mark Davies, the Bishop of Shrewsbury in Shrewsbury Cathedral.

Bibliography
The Apostolic Succession and the Catholic Episcopate in the Christian Episcopal by Robert David Redmile, published by Xulon, 2006 | pages 66,85-86

References

External links
Official Christian Episcopal Church webpage Canada and USA jurisdictions

Christian organizations established in 2002
Anglican denominations in North America
Continuing Anglican denominations
Anglican denominations established in the 21st century